Yellowworld.org is an Asian American political organization founded in January 2002. It began as a community blog for Asian Americans on LiveJournal and launched its own domain on May 8, 2002. By 2007 its website had attracted approximately 6,500 members and published over 480,000 posts. The forums are overseen by a group of administrators and moderators.

Online grassroots advocacy
In May 2003, Yellowworld.org began Project SARSfund, an online charity to purchase medical supplies and equipment for health workers in China battling the SARS epidemic.

In February 2003, Yellowworld.org joined other Asian American advocacy organizations in denouncing U.S. Congressman Howard Coble's endorsement of the internment of Japanese Americans during World War II, launching RemoveCoble!, a call for his resignation as Chair of the House Subcommittee on Crime, Terrorism and Homeland Security.

In November 2002, Yellowworld.org helped launch Justice for Anna Guo, a campaign by Yellowworld.org, the Chinese American Citizens Alliance (CACA), the Asian Pacific American Bar Association (APABA) and Assemblymember Judy Chu (D-Monterey); its purpose is press for justice in the case of the eponymous girl, a fourteen-year-old who was shot three times by police yet convicted for felony assault because she was holding a small knife (with which she had been contemplating suicide). The campaign desires to have the charges dropped and the policeman who fired the shots investigated.

In October 2002 Yellowworld.org launched the online advocacy campaign Project Anti-Disguise to raise awareness of and protest against the costume manufacturer Disguise, Inc. and its product Kung Fool, a mask based on a racist caricature of someone with East Asian features. In only eight days over 8,300 people signed the campaign's online petition calling for the mask's recall while generating nationwide television, print, and radio media coverage. By the end of the eighth day the company issued a nationwide recall and major resellers such as Walmart, Spencer Gifts and Party City pulled the product from their shelves.

References

External links
 Yellowworld.org

Asian-American organizations